The Tobacco Workers' Union (TWU) was a trade union representing workers in all areas of the tobacco industry in the United Kingdom.

History
The union was founded in 1834 in London as the Friendly Society of Operative Tobacconists.  Two years later, it expanded its membership to include tobacco cutters, dryers and stovers and was renamed the United Tobacconists Society.  In 1851, it expanded again to include cigarette makers, and in 1881 it took another name, the United Operative Tobacconists throughout the Kingdom.  For much of this period, the union was based in Liverpool at the houses of its successive general secretaries, but in 1918 it relocated to London.

In 1925, the association became an industrial union, admitting all workers in the tobacco industry, including women, and adopted its final name.  However, the following year, it was disaffiliated from the Trades Union Congress after other unions complained that it was poaching their members.  It rejoined only in 1941.  In 1946, the union merged with the rival National Cigar and Tobacco Workers' Union.

In 1986, the union merged into Technical, Administrative and Supervisory Section, forming the union's new Tobacco Sector.

Election results
The union sponsored its Liverpool district organiser as a Labour Party candidate in the 1959 general election:

General secretaries
1834: Robert Stevens

1910s: E. Kayler
1924: C. W. Dorrell
1925: Andrew Boyd
1941: Percy Belcher
1964: David Burke
1967: Charles Butler
1969: Doug Grieve

References

External links
Catalogue of the TWU archives, held at the Modern Records Centre, University of Warwick

Defunct trade unions of the United Kingdom
1834 establishments in the United Kingdom
Tobacco industry trade unions
Retail trade unions
Trade unions established in the 1830s
Trade unions disestablished in 1986
Trade unions based in London